Conduction is the process by which heat is transferred from the hotter end to the colder end of an object. The ability of the object to conduct heat is known as its thermal conductivity, and is denoted .

Heat spontaneously flows along a temperature gradient (i.e. from a hotter body to a colder body). For example, heat is conducted from the hotplate of an electric stove to the bottom of a saucepan in contact with it. In the absence of an opposing external driving energy source, within a body or between bodies, temperature differences decay over time, and thermal equilibrium is approached, temperature becoming more uniform.

In conduction, the heat flow is within and through the body itself. In contrast, in heat transfer by thermal radiation, the transfer is often between bodies, which may be separated spatially. Heat can also be transferred by a combination of conduction and radiation. In solids, conduction is mediated by the combination of vibrations and collisions of molecules, propagation and collisions of phonons, and diffusion and collisions of free electrons. In gases and liquids, conduction is due to the collisions and diffusion of molecules during their random motion. Photons in this context do not collide with one another, and so heat transport by electromagnetic radiation is conceptually distinct from heat conduction by microscopic diffusion and collisions of material particles and phonons. But the distinction is often not easily observed unless the material is semi-transparent.

In the engineering sciences, heat transfer includes the processes of thermal radiation, convection, and sometimes mass transfer. Usually, more than one of these processes occurs in a given situation.

Overview

On a microscopic scale, conduction occurs within a body considered as being stationary; this means that the kinetic and potential energies of the bulk motion of the body are separately accounted for. Internal energy diffuses as rapidly moving or vibrating atoms and molecules interact with neighbouring particles, transferring some of their microscopic kinetic and potential energies, these quantities being defined relative to the bulk of the body considered as being stationary. Heat is transferred by conduction when adjacent atoms or molecules collide, or as several electrons move backwards and forwards from atom to atom in a disorganized way so as not to form a macroscopic electric current, or as photons collide and scatter. Conduction is the most significant means of heat transfer within a solid or between solid objects in thermal contact, occurring more readily than in liquids or gases  since the network of relatively close fixed spatial relationships between atoms helps to transfer energy between them by vibration.

Thermal contact conductance is the study of heat conduction between solid bodies in contact. A temperature drop is often observed at the interface between the two surfaces in contact. This phenomenon is said to be a result of a thermal contact resistance existing between the contacting surfaces. Interfacial thermal resistance is a measure of an interface's resistance to thermal flow. This thermal resistance differs from contact resistance, as it exists even at atomically perfect interfaces. Understanding the thermal resistance at the interface between two materials is of primary significance in the study of its thermal properties. Interfaces often contribute significantly to the observed properties of the materials.

The inter-molecular transfer of energy could be primarily by elastic impact, as in fluids, or by free-electron diffusion, as in metals, or phonon vibration, as in insulators. In insulators, the heat flux is carried almost entirely by phonon vibrations.

Metals (e.g., copper, platinum, gold, etc.) are usually good conductors of thermal energy. This is due to the way that metals bond chemically: metallic bonds (as opposed to covalent or ionic bonds) have free-moving electrons that transfer thermal energy rapidly through the metal. The electron fluid of a conductive metallic solid conducts most of the heat flux through the solid. Phonon flux is still present but carries less of the energy. Electrons also conduct electric current through conductive solids, and the thermal and electrical conductivities of most metals have about the same ratio. A good electrical conductor, such as copper, also conducts heat well. Thermoelectricity is caused by the interaction of heat flux and electric current. Heat conduction within a solid is directly analogous to diffusion of particles within a fluid, in the situation where there are no fluid currents.

In gases, heat transfer occurs through collisions of gas molecules with one another. In the absence of convection, which relates to a moving fluid or gas phase, thermal conduction through a gas phase is highly dependent on the composition and pressure of this phase, and in particular, the mean free path of gas molecules relative to the size of the gas gap, as given by the Knudsen number .

To quantify the ease with which a particular medium conducts, engineers employ the thermal conductivity, also known as the conductivity constant or conduction coefficient, k. In thermal conductivity, k is defined as "the quantity of heat, Q, transmitted in time (t) through a thickness (L), in a direction normal to a surface of area (A), due to a temperature difference (ΔT) [...]". Thermal conductivity is a material property that is primarily dependent on the medium's phase, temperature, density, and molecular bonding. Thermal effusivity is a quantity derived from conductivity, which is a measure of its ability to exchange thermal energy with its surroundings.

Steady-state conduction
Steady-state conduction is the form of conduction that happens when the temperature difference(s) driving the conduction are constant, so that (after an equilibration time), the spatial distribution of temperatures (temperature field) in the conducting object does not change any further. Thus, all partial derivatives of temperature concerning space may either be zero or have nonzero values, but all derivatives of temperature at any point concerning time are uniformly zero. In steady-state conduction, the amount of heat entering any region of an object is equal to the amount of heat coming out (if this were not so, the temperature would be rising or falling, as thermal energy was tapped or trapped in a region).

For example, a bar may be cold at one end and hot at the other, but after a state of steady-state conduction is reached, the spatial gradient of temperatures along the bar does not change any further, as time proceeds. Instead, the temperature remains constant at any given cross-section of the rod normal to the direction of heat transfer, and this temperature varies linearly in space in the case where there is no heat generation in the rod.

In steady-state conduction, all the laws of direct current electrical conduction can be applied to "heat currents". In such cases, it is possible to take "thermal resistances" as the analog to electrical resistances. In such cases, temperature plays the role of voltage, and heat transferred per unit time (heat power) is the analog of electric current. Steady-state systems can be modeled by networks of such thermal resistances in series and parallel, in exact analogy to electrical networks of resistors. See purely resistive thermal circuits for an example of such a network.

Transient conduction

During any period in which temperatures changes in time at any place within an object, the mode of thermal energy flow is termed transient conduction. Another term is "non-steady-state" conduction, referring to the time-dependence of temperature fields in an object. Non-steady-state situations appear after an imposed change in temperature at a boundary of an object. They may also occur with temperature changes inside an object, as a result of a new source or sink of heat suddenly introduced within an object, causing temperatures near the source or sink to change in time.

When a new perturbation of temperature of this type happens, temperatures within the system change in time toward a new equilibrium with the new conditions, provided that these do not change. After equilibrium, heat flow into the system once again equals the heat flow out, and temperatures at each point inside the system no longer change. Once this happens, transient conduction is ended, although steady-state conduction may continue if heat flow continues.

If changes in external temperatures or internal heat generation changes are too rapid for the equilibrium of temperatures in space to take place, then the system never reaches a state of unchanging temperature distribution in time, and the system remains in a transient state.

An example of a new source of heat "turning on" within an object, causing transient conduction, is an engine starting in an automobile. In this case, the transient thermal conduction phase for the entire machine is over, and the steady-state phase appears, as soon as the engine reaches steady-state operating temperature. In this state of steady-state equilibrium, temperatures vary greatly from the engine cylinders to other parts of the automobile, but at no point in space within the automobile does temperature increase or decrease. After establishing this state, the transient conduction phase of heat transfer is over.

New external conditions also cause this process: for example, the copper bar in the example steady-state conduction experiences transient conduction as soon as one end is subjected to a different temperature from the other. Over time, the field of temperatures inside the bar reaches a new steady-state, in which a constant temperature gradient along the bar is finally set up, and this gradient then stays constant in time. Typically, such a new steady-state gradient is approached exponentially with time after a new temperature-or-heat source or sink, has been introduced. When a "transient conduction" phase is over, heat flow may continue at high power, so long as temperatures do not change.

An example of transient conduction that does not end with steady-state conduction, but rather no conduction, occurs when a hot copper ball is dropped into oil at a low temperature. Here, the temperature field within the object begins to change as a function of time, as the heat is removed from the metal, and the interest lies in analyzing this spatial change of temperature within the object over time until all gradients disappear entirely (the ball has reached the same temperature as the oil). Mathematically, this condition is also approached exponentially; in theory, it takes infinite time, but in practice, it is over, for all intents and purposes, in a much shorter period. At the end of this process with no heat sink but the internal parts of the ball (which are finite), there is no steady-state heat conduction to reach. Such a state never occurs in this situation, but rather the end of the process is when there is no heat conduction at all.

The analysis of non-steady-state conduction systems is more complex than that of steady-state systems. If the conducting body has a simple shape, then exact analytical mathematical expressions and solutions may be possible (see heat equation for the analytical approach). However, most often, because of complicated shapes with varying thermal conductivities within the shape (i.e., most complex objects, mechanisms or machines in engineering) often the application of approximate theories is required, and/or numerical analysis by computer. One popular graphical method involves the use of Heisler Charts.

Occasionally, transient conduction problems may be considerably simplified if regions of the object being heated or cooled can be identified, for which thermal conductivity is very much greater than that for heat paths leading into the region. In this case, the region with high conductivity can often be treated in the lumped capacitance model, as a "lump" of material with a simple thermal capacitance consisting of its aggregate heat capacity. Such regions warm or cool, but show no significant temperature variation across their extent, during the process (as compared to the rest of the system). This is due to their far higher conductance. During transient conduction, therefore, the temperature across their conductive regions changes uniformly in space, and as a simple exponential in time. An example of such systems is those that follow Newton's law of cooling during transient cooling (or the reverse during heating). The equivalent thermal circuit consists of a simple capacitor in series with a resistor. In such cases, the remainder of the system with a high thermal resistance (comparatively low conductivity) plays the role of the resistor in the circuit.

Relativistic conduction
The theory of relativistic heat conduction is a model that is compatible with the theory of special relativity. For most of the last century, it was recognized that the Fourier equation is in contradiction with the theory of relativity because it admits an infinite speed of propagation of heat signals. For example, according to the Fourier equation, a pulse of heat at the origin would be felt at infinity instantaneously. The speed of information propagation is faster than the speed of light in vacuum, which is physically inadmissible within the framework of relativity.

Quantum conduction
Second sound is a quantum mechanical phenomenon in which heat transfer occurs by wave-like motion, rather than by the more usual mechanism of diffusion. Heat takes the place of pressure in normal sound waves. This leads to a very high thermal conductivity. It is known as "second sound" because the wave motion of heat is similar to the propagation of sound in air.

Fourier's law
The law of heat conduction, also known as Fourier's law, states that the rate of heat transfer through a material is proportional to the negative gradient in the temperature and to the area, at right angles to that gradient, through which the heat flows. We can state this law in two equivalent forms: the integral form, in which we look at the amount of energy flowing into or out of a body as a whole, and the differential form, in which we look at the flow rates or fluxes of energy locally.

Newton's law of cooling is a discrete analogue of Fourier's law, while Ohm's law is the electrical analogue of Fourier's law and Fick's laws of diffusion is its chemical analogue.

Differential form
The differential form of Fourier's law of thermal conduction shows that the local heat flux density  is equal to the product of thermal conductivity  and the negative local temperature gradient . The heat flux density is the amount of energy that flows through a unit area per unit time.

where (including the SI units)
  is the local heat flux density, W/m2,
  is the material's conductivity, W/(m·K),
  is the temperature gradient, K/m.

The thermal conductivity  is often treated as a constant, though this is not always true. While the thermal conductivity of a material generally varies with temperature, the variation can be small over a significant range of temperatures for some common materials. In anisotropic materials, the thermal conductivity typically varies with orientation; in this case  is represented by a second-order tensor. In non-uniform materials,  varies with spatial location.

For many simple applications, Fourier's law is used in its one-dimensional form, for example, in the  direction:

In an isotropic medium, Fourier's law leads to heat equation

with a fundamental solution famously known as heat kernel.

Integral form
By integrating the differential form over the material's total surface , we arrive at the integral form of Fourier's law:

 

where (including the SI units):
  is the amount of heat transferred per unit time (in W),
  is an oriented surface area element (in m2).

The above differential equation, when integrated for a homogeneous material of 1-D geometry between two endpoints at constant temperature, gives the heat flow rate as

where
  is the time interval during which the amount of heat  flows through a cross-section of the material,
  is the cross-sectional surface area,
  is the temperature difference between the ends,
  is the distance between the ends.
This law forms the basis for the derivation of the heat equation.

Conductance
Writing

where  is the conductance, in W/(m2 K).

Fourier's law can also be stated as:

The reciprocal of conductance is resistance,  is given by:

In a multilayer partition, the total conductance is related to the conductance of its layers by:
 or equivalently 

So, when dealing with a multilayer partition, the following formula is usually used:

For heat conduction from one fluid to another through a barrier, it is sometimes important to consider the conductance of the thin film of fluid that remains stationary next to the barrier. This thin film of fluid is difficult to quantify because its characteristics depend upon complex conditions of turbulence and viscosity—but when dealing with thin high-conductance barriers it can sometimes be quite significant.

Intensive-property representation
The previous conductance equations, written in terms of extensive properties, can be reformulated in terms of intensive properties.  Ideally, the formulae for conductance should produce a quantity with dimensions independent of distance, like Ohm's Law for electrical resistance, and conductance, .

From the electrical formula: , where ρ is resistivity, x is length, and A is cross-sectional area, we have , where G is conductance, k is conductivity, x is length, and A is cross-sectional area.

For heat,

where  is the conductance.

Fourier's law can also be stated as:

analogous to Ohm's law,  or 

The reciprocal of conductance is resistance, R, given by:

analogous to Ohm's law, 

The rules for combining resistances and conductances (in series and parallel) are the same for both heat flow and electric current.

Cylindrical shells
Conduction through cylindrical shells (e.g. pipes) can be calculated from the internal radius, the external radius, the length, and the temperature difference between the inner and outer wall, .

The surface area of the cylinder is 

When Fourier's equation is applied:

and rearranged:

then the rate of heat transfer is:

the thermal resistance is:

It is important to note that this is the log-mean radius.

Spherical
The conduction through a spherical shell with internal radius, and external radius, can be calculated in a similar manner as for a cylindrical shell.

The surface area of the sphere is: 

Solving in a similar manner as for a cylindrical shell (see above) produces:

Transient thermal conduction

Interface heat transfer

The heat transfer at an interface is considered a transient heat flow. To analyze this problem, the Biot number is important to understand how the system behaves. The Biot number is determined by:

If the system has a Biot number of less than 0.1, the material behaves according to Newtonian cooling, i.e. with negligible temperature gradient within the body. If the Biot number is greater than 0.1, the system behaves as a series solution. The temperature profile in terms of time can be derived from the equation

which becomes

This value is different at every interface and is an important concept in understanding heat flow at an interface.

The series solution can be analyzed with a nomogram. A nomogram has a relative temperature as the  coordinate and the Fourier number, which is calculated by

The Biot number increases as the Fourier number decreases. There are five steps to determine a temperature profile in terms of time.
 Calculate the Biot number
 Determine which relative depth matters, either x or L.
 Convert time to the Fourier number.
 Convert  to relative temperature with the boundary conditions.
 Compared required to point to trace specified Biot number on the nomogram.

Thermal conduction applications

Splat cooling

Splat cooling is a method for quenching small droplets of molten materials by rapid contact with a cold surface. Splat cooling rapidly ends in a steady state temperature, and is similar in form to the Gaussian diffusion equation. The temperature profile, with respect to the position and time of this type of cooling, varies with:

Splat cooling is a fundamental concept that has been adapted for practical use in the form of thermal spraying. This varies according to the material.

Metal quenching

Metal quenching is a transient heat transfer process in terms of the time temperature transformation (TTT). It is possible to manipulate the cooling process to adjust the phase of a suitable material. For example, appropriate quenching of steel can convert a desirable proportion of its content of austenite to martensite, creating a very hard and strong product. To achieve this, it is necessary to quench at the "nose" (or eutectic) of the TTT diagram. Since materials differ in their Biot numbers, the time it takes for the material to quench, or the Fourier number, varies in practice. In steel, the quenching temperature range is generally from 600°C to 200°C. To control the quenching time and to select suitable quenching media, it is necessary to determine the Fourier number from the desired quenching time, the relative temperature drop, and the relevant Biot number. Usually, the correct figures are read from a standard nomogram. By calculating the heat transfer coefficient from this Biot number, one can find a liquid medium suitable for the application.

Zeroth law of thermodynamics

One statement of the so-called zeroth law of thermodynamics is directly focused on the idea of conduction of heat. Bailyn (1994) writes that "the zeroth law may be stated: All diathermal walls are equivalent".

A diathermal wall is a physical connection between two bodies that allows the passage of heat between them. Bailyn is referring to diathermal walls that exclusively connect two bodies, especially conductive walls.

This statement of the "zeroth law" belongs to an idealized theoretical discourse, and actual physical walls may have peculiarities that do not conform to its generality.

For example, the material of the wall must not undergo a phase transition, such as evaporation or fusion, at the temperature at which it must conduct heat. But when only thermal equilibrium is considered and time is not urgent, so that the conductivity of the material does not matter too much, one suitable heat conductor is as good as another. Conversely, another aspect of the zeroth law is that, subject again to suitable restrictions, a given diathermal wall is indifferent to the nature of the heat bath to which it is connected. For example, the glass bulb of a thermometer acts as a diathermal wall whether exposed to a gas or a liquid, provided that they do not corrode or melt it.

These differences are among the defining characteristics of heat transfer. In a sense, they are symmetries of heat transfer.

Thermal conduction instruments

Thermal conductivity analyzer 
Thermal conduction property of any gas under standard conditions of pressure and temperature is a fixed quantity. This property of a known reference gas or known reference gas mixtures can, therefore, be used for certain sensory applications, such as the thermal conductivity analyzer.

The working of this instrument is by principle based on the Wheatstone bridge containing four filaments whose resistances are matched. Whenever a certain gas is passed over such network of filaments, their resistance changes due to the altered thermal conductivity of the filaments and thereby changing the net voltage output from the Wheatstone Bridge. This voltage output will be correlated with the database to identify the gas sample.

Gas sensor  
The principle of thermal conductivity of gases can also be used to measure the concentration of a gas in a binary mixture of gases.

Working: if the same gas is present around all the Wheatstone bridge filaments, then the same temperature is maintained in all the filaments and hence same resistances are also maintained; resulting in a balanced Wheatstone bridge. However, If the dissimilar gas sample (or gas mixture) is passed over one set of two filaments and the reference gas on the other set of two filaments, then the Wheatstone bridge becomes unbalanced. And the resulting net voltage output of the circuit will be correlated with the database to identify the constituents of the sample gas.

Using this technique many unknown gas samples can be identified by comparing their thermal conductivity with other reference gas of known thermal conductivity. The most commonly used reference gas is nitrogen; as the thermal conductivity of most common gases (except hydrogen and helium) are similar to that of nitrogen.

See also
 List of thermal conductivities
 Electrical conduction
 Convection diffusion equation
 R-value (insulation)
 Heat pipe
 Fick's law of diffusion
 Relativistic heat conduction
 Churchill–Bernstein equation
 Fourier number
 Biot number
 False diffusion

References

Dehghani, F 2007, CHNG2801 – Conservation and Transport Processes: Course Notes, University of Sydney, Sydney
 John H Lienhard IV and John H Lienhard V, 'A Heat Transfer Textbook', Fifth Edition, Dover Pub., Mineola, NY, 2019

External links

 Heat conduction – Thermal-FluidsPedia
 Newton's Law of Cooling by Jeff Bryant based on a program by Stephen Wolfram, Wolfram Demonstrations Project.

be-x-old:Цеплаправоднасьць

Heat conduction
Heat transfer
Physical quantities

be:Цеплаправоднасць
bg:Топлопроводимост
Transport phenomena